Billy Two Hats is a 1974 American Western film directed by Ted Kotcheff. It stars Gregory Peck, Jack Warden and Desi Arnaz, Jr.

Filmed on-location in Israel, Billy Two Hats is from a script by Scottish writer Alan Sharp, the screenwriter of Rob Roy and Ulzana's Raid.

Plot

Following a bank robbery in the American west, the partner of Scottish outlaw Arch Deans is killed and his young Indian half breed friend Billy Two Hats is captured.

While Billy is being transported, Deans gets the drop on Sheriff Henry Gifford at a remote trading post, enabling Billy to escape. As they flee, the sheriff's friend, the trading post owner, named Copeland, takes down his old long-range buffalo rifle and fires a shot that kills Deans' horse, breaking his leg. Billy builds a travois on which Deans can ride, dragged behind Billy's horse. Deans and Billy encounter trouble on the trail, four Indians demand whiskey from them but Billy talks their way out of it.

Billy and Deans encounter Spencer and his wife, Esther, at their remote homestead. Deans persuades Spencer to take him in his wagon to get horses on the condition that Billy stay with Esther to protect her and the homestead from marauding Indians. Billy is also to keep a look out for the pursuing Gifford.

Billy and Esther spend their time together talking and develop romantic feelings for each other. Esther, a young mail-order bride from the East, is unhappy with her older abusive husband. She falls in love with the young good looking Billy. Gifford finds the two in bed together, assumes Billy raped the woman, becomes enraged, and beats him. Esther attempts to explain but can't because she stutters uncontrollably when distressed.

Deans and Spencer encounter trouble on the trail, the four Indians who demanded whiskey from Deans and Billy earlier, ambush their wagon in a canyon, killing the horse and besiege them. Spencer is killed.

Gifford, Esther and Billy then set out after Deans. They find Deans near death. With Esther's help Billy kills Gifford. Deans dies of his wounds. Not believing in burying the dead, Billy places his body in a tree atop a hill, Indian fashion. He and Esther ride off together.

Cast

 Gregory Peck as Arch Deans
 Desi Arnaz, Jr. as Billy Two Hats
 Jack Warden as Sheriff Henry Gifford 
 David Huddleston as Copeland, Saloon Owner
 Sian Barbara Allen as Esther Spencer
 John Pearce as Spencer
 Dawn Little Sky as Copeland's Squaw
 W. Vincent St. Cyr as Indian Leader
 Henry Medicine Hat as Indian
 Zev Berlinsky as Indian
 Antony Scott as Indian
 Vic Armstrong as Harry Sweets Bradley

Reception
Variety called the film "a fresh, different oater (the first filmed in Israel) that opens with violence and contains some throughout but never lingers lovingly on mayhem and gore; ergo, it's tame for the Sam Peckinpah bunch, but so well handled in every way it should have a good future both here and abroad." Gene Siskel of the Chicago Tribune gave the film 2 stars out of 4 and wrote, "When the action turns, as inevitably it must, to conversation between Peck and Arnaz, 'Billy Two Hats' becomes vapid. And when young Arnaz strikes up a romance with a rancher's stuttering mail-order bride, the action and dialog become positively embarrassing." Kevin Thomas of the Los Angeles Times wrote, "Writer Alan Sharp's characters are all well-drawn and well-acted, but 'Billy Two Hats' pacing is too languid and its style too portentous to sustain interest in them." John Raisbeck of The Monthly Film Bulletin wrote, "Like Ulzana's Raid, also written by Alan Sharp, Billy Two Hats is a film of hunters and hunted, centring on the father/son relationship; only here the traditional roles are reversed, with the grizzled Deans (Gregory Peck wrestling unsuccessfully with a Scottish accent) having to lean on his resourceful young companion. The motif, however, is handled with an obviousness which characterises much of the film."

See also
 List of American films of 1974

References

External links
 
 

1974 films
1974 Western (genre) films
American Western (genre) films
Films directed by Ted Kotcheff
Films scored by John Scott (composer)
United Artists films
Films shot in Israel
1970s English-language films
1970s American films